Kluang Inner Ring Road comprising Jalan Hospital, Jalan Rambutan and Jalan Mohd Salim, Federal Route 172 (formerly Johor State Route J191), is a federal road in Kluang town, Johor, Malaysia.

Features
At most sections, the Federal Route 172 was built under the JKR R5 road standard, allowing maximum speed limit of up to 90 km/h.

List of junctions

References

Kluang District
Malaysian Federal Roads